Tullio Rossi (born 2 June 1948 in Rome) is an Italian former cyclist.

Major results
1972
2nd Gran Premio della Liberazione
1973
1st Stage 12 Giro d'Italia

References

1948 births
Living people
Italian male cyclists
Cyclists from Rome